Michael Prabawa Mohede (November 7, 1983 – July 31, 2016), better known as Mike, was an Indonesian singer and the winner of the second season of Indonesian Idol. He represented Indonesia in Asian Idol, losing to Hady Mirza of Singapore Idol.

Indonesian Idol performances 
 Top 24: Right Here Waiting by Richard Marx
 Top 12: Pupus by Dewa 19
 Top 11: Kamulah Satu-Satunya by Dewa 19
 Top 10: Bahasa Kalbu by Titi DJ
 Top 9: Sinaran by Sheila Majid
 Top 8: Mengejar Matahari by Ari Lasso
 Top 7: Nada Kasih by Fariz RM
 Top 6: Crazy Little Thing Called Love by Queen
 Top 5: Jadikanlah Aku Pacarmu by Sheila on 7
 Top 5: Unchained Melody by The Righteous Brothers
 Top 4: Enggak Ngerti by Kahitna
 Top 4: Roman Picisan by Dewa 19
 Top 3: Bunda by Melly Goeslaw
 Top 3: Because of You by Keith Martin
 Grand Final: Semua Untuk Cinta by Hendy Irvan
 Grand Final: Bahasa Kalbu by Titi DJ
 Grand Final: Ketika Kau Menyapa by Marcell Siahaan

Discography

Studio albums
2005 Mike
2010 Kemenanganku
2011 Tak Seperti Dulu Single
2013 Mampu Tanpanya Single
2014 Kucinta Dirinya Single
2014 Tiada Kata (ft. Mulan Jameela) Single2015 KeduaOther works
2005 Seri Cinta'' (Indonesian Idol compilation)

Death
He died on July 31, 2016, at RS Premier Bintaro (Bintaro Premier Hospital) in South Tangerang, Indonesia from a heart attack. He was 32.

References

External links 
 
Mike Mohede Official Friendster

1983 births
2016 deaths
Asian Idol
Indonesian Christians
Indo people
Indonesian people of Dutch descent
Indonesian people of Filipino descent
People of Sangirese descent
Indonesian gospel singers
Indonesian Idol winners
21st-century Indonesian male singers
Indonesian pop singers
Indonesian rhythm and blues singers
Indonesian soul singers
Singers from Jakarta